Solve may refer to:
 Sölve, viking king of Sweden
 SOLVE, an American environmental organization
 Solve (advertising agency)
 "Solve" (song), by Japanese pop band Dream
 HSwMS Sölve

See also 
 Equation solving
 Problem solving
 Solution (disambiguation)